Pierre Laclède Liguest or Pierre Laclède (22 November 1729 – 20 June 1778) was a French fur trader who, with his young assistant and stepson Auguste Chouteau, founded St. Louis in 1764, in what was then Spanish Upper Louisiana, in present-day Missouri.

Early life 
Laclède was born on 22 November 1729 in Bedous, Béarn, France.  He was one of the younger sons in his family, with parents being office-holders, authors, and scholars of some prominence.  His father, and later inherited by his brother, held the position of avocat au parlement de Navarre, a traditional region including Béarn, located in Pau.  His uncle, likewise, was a man of letters, writing a history of Portugal.  Overall, Laclède is said to be a reflection of desire for knowledge that filled his whole family.

In 1755, Laclède arrived in New Orleans at the age of 26.  The cause of his trip is argued about; some historians believe he was traveling for pleasure.  Others say that he was looking to make his fortune in the new lands, as done by many other younger sons.  Allegedly, Laclède gave up positions in the church and army and rather preferred to explore the new world. Over the next few years after his arrival in New Orleans, he became a highly successful trader.  Unlike his contemporaries, he embraced the change of lifestyle. Historians often comment on his energy, knowledge, and good judgement, which suggest past business experience, and a greater understanding for his success as a merchant.

During this time, Laclède also began to form relationships with the officials and Native Americans in the region around New Orleans.  It was through many of these conversations that Laclède learned of the opportunities that awaited further north, and acted as an inspiration for his future exploration and founding of St. Louis.

Personal life 
When first arriving in New Orleans, Laclède is described as handsome.  He was said to be olive-skinned with dark eyes, tall and slender.  He moved like a fencer with extreme grace and ease and retained an air of command at all time.  Before leaving for New Orleans, it is said that Laclède won a swordsmanship duel. However, the prize is unknown.

Upon arriving to New Orleans, Laclède met and fell in love with Madame Marie-Therese Bourgeois Chouteau.  It is documented that they had a liaison for many years following, resulting in the birth of four children:  Jean Pierre (1758), Marie Pélagie (1760), Marie Louise (1762), and Victoire (1764) Chouteau.   Madame Chouteau at the time was married to another man, René Auguste Chouteau.  Ten years her senior, Rene owned an inn and tavern at the time of their marriage.  To the outsider, it was a good marriage, as Madame Chouteau had little to no dowry and little to recommend her.  However, Rene turned out to be an abusive husband, and not long after the birth of their first son, Auguste Chouteau, left her alone in New Orleans and returned to France without her.

Though it is documented that they had a strong relationship, Laclède's and Madame Chouteau's relationship was coated with difficulties.  As divorce was not allowed during that time by the church or the state, Madame Chouteau remained married to Rene for the majority of hers and Laclède's relationship.  This prompted lots of whispers and gossip, let alone the possible strain of Rene returning from France any day.  Historians believe that this in addition was a contributing factor to Laclède's decision to travel upstream to a new trading post.

Upon the founding of St. Louis, Laclède wrote to Madame Chouteau, telling her to come to the colony.  Later that year, after she gave birth to her fifth child and Laclède's fourth, she traveled with all of their children to meet Laclède.  There, Laclède built a house for them and bequeathed it to them in his will.  Madame Chouteau in addition was well loved in the colony; she was kind but sensible, understanding but stubborn.  Within a few years, people started referring to her as the "Queen" of St. Louis.

A few years after arriving to St. Louis, René, Madame Chouteau's husband, returned to New Orleans, and required that his wife return to him.  By law, he was allowed to do this.  Various governmental officials tried to slow down the process of Madame Chouteau returning to her husband, sending letters that ended requiring more letters.  However, before any real action could be taken, René Chouteau died in a drunken stupor one night, thus ending any potential threat from him.

Founding of St. Louis 
Laclède was sponsored by the New Orleans merchant Gilbert Antoine de Saint-Maxent in 1763 to construct a trading post near the confluence of the Mississippi and Missouri rivers. Maxent was offered monopolies by D'Abbadie, which were passed on to Laclède as a six-year trading monopoly with the area's Native Americans.

Given the length and the impending winter, Laclède began prepping for the journey immediately.  In August, he and a small crew, which included his common law wife's son René Auguste Chouteau. Jr.  Though few outposts or trading posts were already set-up, many Europeans had made the journey up the Mississippi River, making the trip more monotonous than exciting.    They arrived at the confluence in December. The confluence area was too marshy to build a town, so they selected a site  downriver. Legend has it that St. Louis was founded on Saint Valentine's Day of 1764. In the 1770 census of Spanish Illinois, Laclede is listed as the owner of seven enslaved Native Americans. 

The St. Louis downtown riverfront area is named Laclede's Landing in his honor. He is also the namesake of Laclede County, Missouri, Laclede, Missouri, the Pierre Laclede Honors College at the University of Missouri–St. Louis, Pierre Laclede Elementary School in St. Louis and the Pierre Laclede office tower in Clayton, Missouri. Laclede is also recognized with a star on the St. Louis Walk of Fame.

See also
Laclede's Landing, St. Louis
LaClede Town

References

External links 
 "Pierre Laclède", National Park Service biography 
"Pierre Laclede", St. Louis Walk of Fame
Pierre Laclède in the Louisiana Dictionary of Biography – Scroll down to find Laclede.

"Remains of St. Louis founder's home believed to have been located"

People of Louisiana (New France)
Pre-statehood history of Missouri
French emigrants to the United States
People from St. Louis
1729 births
1778 deaths
American city founders
People from Béarn